Sarrewerden is a commune in the Bas-Rhin department in Grand Est in northeastern France.

The localities of Bischtroff-sur-Sarre and Zollingen are incorporated in the commune since 1972.

See also
 Communes of the Bas-Rhin department

References

Communes of Bas-Rhin
Bas-Rhin communes articles needing translation from French Wikipedia